Frédéric Bozo is a professor at the University of Paris III: Sorbonne Nouvelle, where he teaches contemporary history and international relations. He is also a Senior Research Associate at the Institut français des relations internationales (IFRI) where his focus is on Atlantic and European security issues. His prior teaching positions include the Institut d’Etudes Politiques de Paris (1989–1992), the University of Paris X-Nanterre (1992–1994) and the University of Marne-la-Vallée (1994–1998). He is also a member of the Centre de recherche sur l’histoire du monde Atlantique (CRHMA/ Research Center on the History of the Atlantic World, university of Nantes) and of the Groupe français pour l’histoire de l’arme nucléaire (GREFHAN, the French branch of the Nuclear History Programme).

Bozo received his PhD in contemporary history from the University of Paris X-Nanterre (1993) and his Habilitation from the University of Paris III (1997). An alumnus of the Ecole Normale Supérieure and the Institut d’Etudes Politiques de Paris, he holds an Agrégation in history; he has also studied at Harvard University and speaks English fluently.

Publications, monographs and articles in English 
 French Foreign Policy since 1945: An Introduction
 Mitterrand, the End of the Cold War, and German Unification (New York: Berghahn Books, 2009)
 Should Nato Play a More Political Role?  A debate between Frédéric Bozo and Espen Barth Eide, Director of the International Politics Department at the Norwegian Institute of International Affairs (NUPI), Oslo. Nato Review, n.1, Spring 2005.
 Gulliver Unbound: America's Imperial Temptation and the War in Iraq with Stanley Hoffman, Rowman and Littlefield Lanham, Washington, 2004.
 " 'The French Difference': An Exchange" exchange with Tony Judt in The New York Review of Books, 07/05/2001.
 Two Strategies for Europe : De Gaulle, the United States and the Atlantic Alliance, Rowman & Littlefield Publishers, Washington, 2000.
 Where Does the Atlantic Alliance Stand? The Improbable Partnership, Notes de l'IFRI n.6 bis, 1999
  "France" in Michael Brenner (dir.), NATO and Collective Security after the Cold War, London, Macmillan, 1998
 Détente versus Alliance : France, the United States and the Politics of the Harmel Report (1964–1968), Contemporary European History, 7, 3, 1998

Publications in French 

 Mitterrand, la fin de la guerre froide et l’unification allemande, De Yalta à Maastricht, Odile Jacob, Paris, 2005
 Relations internationales et stratégie de la guerre froide à la guerre contre le terrorisme (collectif), Rennes University Presses, Rennes, 2005.
 États-Unis – Europe: réinventer l'Alliance, with Jacques Beltran (dir.) Travaux et recherches de l'Ifri, Paris, 2001.
 La France et l'alliance atlantique depuis la fin de la guerre froide - Le modèle gaullien en question (1989–1999)  Monograph of the French Ministry of Defence center for History studies (CEHD) n.17, Paris, 2001. Download as a PDF
 La Politique étrangère de la France depuis 1945, La Découverte, Paris, 1997
 La France et l'OTAN, 1949-1996, with Maurice Vaïsse and Pierre Mélandri (dir.), Complexe, Bruxelles, 1996
 La France et l'OTAN. De la guerre froide au nouvel ordre européen, Masson, Paris, 1991

External links
 Directory page at the University of Paris 3

21st-century French historians
Historians of France
University of Paris alumni
École Normale Supérieure alumni
Sciences Po alumni
Academic staff of Sorbonne Nouvelle University Paris 3
Harvard University alumni
Living people
French male non-fiction writers
Year of birth missing (living people)
20th-century French historians